The Ordre de la Générosité (Order of Generosity) was a chivalric order of the Kingdom of Prussia, established in 1667 by the nine-year-old crown prince Frederick of Brandenburg, later Frederick I of Prussia. It was also known in German as Für Edelmut (For Generosity) or the Gnadenkreuz (literally Grace Cross). The Order's jewel consisted of a gemstone in a small golden cross, later with the inscription "générosité".

When first set up it had no statutes or constitution, though its guiding principle was that its members should live "generously in all things". Under Frederick William I of Prussia the Order was mainly awarded as a reward for good service in recruiting the Langen Kerls. It was the second highest of the Prussian orders after the Order of the Black Eagle. In June 1740, immediately after his accession, Frederick the Great took over the format, shape and colours of the order for his new Pour le Mérite order, though De la Générosité continued to be sporadically awarded to foreigners until 1791.

References 

Orders, decorations, and medals of Prussia
1667 establishments in Europe
1740 disestablishments
1791 disestablishments in Europe
Frederick I of Prussia
Organizations established in 1667
Organizations established in 1791